The Tishrin Dam is a dam on the Euphrates, located  east of Aleppo in Aleppo Governorate, Syria. Construction lasted between 1991 and 1999. Rescue excavations in the area that would be flooded by the dam's reservoir have provided important information on ancient settlement in the area from the Pre-Pottery Neolithic A (PPNA) period upward.

Characteristics of the dam and the reservoir

The Tishrin Dam is a hydroelectric rock-fill dam on the Euphrates, located upstream from the much larger Tabqa Dam. Annual power production of the Tishrin Dam is expected to be 1.6 billion kilowatt hour. Apart from the Euphrates, the Tishrin Dam reservoir is also fed by the Sajur River.

Construction started in 1991 and was completed in 1999. One reason for the construction of the Tishrin Dam was the lower than expected power output of the hydroelectrical power station at the Tabqa Dam. This disappointing performance can be attributed to the lower than expected water flow in the Euphrates as it enters Syria from Turkey. Lack of maintenance may also have been a cause. The Tishrin Dam is the last of three dams that Syria has built on the Euphrates. The other two dams are the Tabqa Dam, finished in 1973, and the Baath Dam, finished in 1986. In the 2000s, Syria had plans to build a fourth dam on the Euphrates between Raqqa and Deir ez-Zor – the Halabiye Dam.

Rescue excavations in the Tishrin Dam Reservoir region
The Tishrin Dam Reservoir has flooded an area in which numerous archaeological sites were located. To preserve or document as much information from these sites as possible, archaeological excavations were carried out at 15 of them during construction of the dam. Among the oldest excavated and now flooded sites is Jerf el Ahmar, where a French mission worked between 1995 and 1999. Their work revealed that the site had been occupied between 9200 and 8700 BC at the end of the Pre-Pottery Neolithic A period and the beginning of the Pre-Pottery Neolithic B. In its multiple occupation phases, the site contained a sequence of round and rectangular buildings. In the later occupation levels of the site, a number of buildings have been excavated that were partly dug into the soil and had stone walls. Their size, internal division, decoration and the finds of human skulls as foundation deposits led the excavators to suggest that these buildings had a communal function. These finds were deemed so important that in 1999, flooding of the Tishrin Dam Reservoir was postponed for two weeks so that three houses could be dismantled and rebuilt in a museum near the site.

Syrian Civil War 
On 26 November 2012, rebel fighters captured the dam from Syrian Government forces of President Bashar al-Assad during a battle of the Syrian Civil War. The dam's capture cut off a major government supply line to and from Raqqa, while unifying stretches of rebel territory on either side of the Euphrates River. The dam's capture also cut off one of the last government supply lines to Aleppo, further encircling soldiers fighting in the city. In September 2014, ISIL captured the dam from rebel forces. In December 2015, the Syrian Democratic Forces captured the dam from ISIL.

See also

Water resources management in Syria

Notes

References

External links
 Jerf el-Ahmar website

Hydroelectric power stations in Syria
Dams in Syria
Dams on the Euphrates River
Dams completed in 1999
Buildings and structures in Aleppo Governorate
Crossings of the Euphrates
1999 establishments in Syria